Alexandru Ciorba, better known as Sandu Ciorba, is a Romanian singer-songwriter known for his work in the "etno" musical genre (Romanian folkloric music with a modern twist). His singles "Dalibomba" and "Pe Cimpoi" have become viral in Poland, and critics praised his musical and video style as "unique and weird".  Born in Cluj-Napoca, Ciorba is of Romani heritage.

Career 
His hit single "Dalibomba" shot him to stardom in Poland, where viewers and critics described the track as "It is a piece of shit, but I am watching it for the fifth time". , the accompanying music video for "Dalibomba" has received over 43 million views. The title of the hit is translated in Polish as "Wielka dzika bomba" ("Huge Wild Bomb"). 

In 2015, Romanian press widely commented on the fact that Huffington Post UK tongue-in-cheek nominated Ciorba's hit "Pe cimpoi" ("On Cimpoi" or "By Cimpoi"; over 50 million views) " the weirdest video on the internet". The tune of "Pe cimpoi" draws upon Transylvanian folklore tunes. These parody style songs is only part of Ciorba's work. In particular, he cooperates with manele singer Nicolae Guță. 

Ciorba's songs have appeared in several films. Sandu Ciorba cooperates with Viper Production music studio devoted to Romani music.

Discography
2007: Fără adversari Vol.2 (with Nicolae Guță), Viper Productions, iTunes 
2008: Fără adversari Vol.3 (with Nicolae Guță), Viper Productions, iTunes 
2012: Fără adversari Vol.4 (with Nicolae Guță), Viper Productions, iTunes 
2015: King of Gipsy Music, Viper Productions, iTunes 
2017: Fără adversari Vol.5 (with Nicolae Guță), Viper Productions, iTunes 

Some songs of Sandu Ciorba were included in various collections of Roma music by Viper Productions.

Filmography 
Sandu Ciorba's songs have appeared in several films.
 2013 American-Romanian film Charlie Countryman. 
 2009 French film Korkoro about the times during the  Porajmos ("Gypsy Holocaust"). 
 2006 French film Transylvania.

References

External links

Year of birth missing (living people)
Living people
Romanian Romani people
Romani singers
Romanian manele singers
Musicians from Cluj-Napoca